Alfonso López (born 8 January 1953) is a Panamanian former professional boxer who competed from 1971 to 1985. He held the WBA flyweight title in 1976.

Professional career
López boxed professionally from 1971 to 1985, compiling a record of 39 wins, 18 losses and 2 draws (ties), 21 wins and 8 losses coming by knockout. He had wins over Erbito Salavarria twice, including winning the WBA world Flyweight title with a fifteenth-round knockout on February 27, 1976 in Manila, Shoji Oguma, future multiple time world champion and hall of famer Hilario Zapata and Freddy Castillo in Castillo's hometown of Mérida, Yucatán, Mexico.

References

External links

Succession

Living people
1953 births
Panamanian male boxers
Flyweight boxers
World Boxing Association champions
World flyweight boxing champions
Afro-Panamanian
People from Darién Province
20th-century Panamanian people